Diablo Range is an unincorporated census county division (CCD) located in the Diablo Mountains Range, on the eastern side of Santa Clara County, California.

The Henry W. Coe State Park and Pacheco State Park, the Sierra Vista Open Space, and Blue Oak Ranch Reserve preserves, along with the Mount Hamilton Lick Observatory, and the Ashrama retreat center are also located in the area.

The region has a warm and dry Mediterranean climate.  Although some agriculture exists, many ranches in the area are used for livestock grazing or hunting game.

As of the 2010 US Census, the population was 1,508 residents of whom 55.2% were non-Hispanic white, 26.4% Hispanic, 12.7% Asian, and 5.7% of other races, with a median age of 42.6 years old. As of 2009, the median income was $91,977 and median home price $1,272,823.

Most residents and businesses in the area use postal ZIP codes from neighboring cities of Livermore, Milpitas, San Jose, Morgan Hill, Gilroy, or Hollister. The telephone area codes are 408 and 669 (Santa Clara County), 209 (overlaps with Stanislaus County to the east), and 831 (overlaps with San Benito County to the south).

History 
In Spanish, the word diablo means "devil".

The region includes a large portion of the Northern Diablo Range. It is home to recovering populations of tule elk, golden eagles, and Bay checkerspot butterflies.

References

External links 
 Map of Diablo Range, California

Unincorporated communities in Santa Clara County, California
Census county divisions in Santa Clara County, California
Diablo Range
Unincorporated communities in California